Patrick Flynn may refer to:

Patrick Flynn (Canadian politician) (1921–1996), Canadian Liberal Party politician of Irish extraction
Patrick Flynn (athlete) (1894–1969), American Olympic medalist
Patrick Flynn (composer) (1936–2008), composer and conductor
Patrick Flynn (hurler) (1867–1948), Irish hurler 
Patrick J. Flynn, race horse trainer
Patrick Flynn, vocalist for Have Heart and Fiddlehead

See also 
Pat Flynn (disambiguation)
Patrick O'Flynn (born 1965), politician